The 2009–10 Northern Illinois Huskies men's basketball team represented Northern Illinois University in the college basketball season of 2009–10. The team, led by head coached by Ricardo Patton, are members of the Mid-American Conference and played their homes game at the Convocation Center. They finished the season 10–20, 6–10 in MAC play and lost in the first round of the 2010 MAC men's basketball tournament.

Before the season

Roster changes
The Huskies only lost one senior from last year's team.  That player, Sean Smith, started in 29 of Northern Illinois' 30 games for that season (only one player had started all 30).  He contributed an average 8.4 points per game.  However, Northern Illinois has recruited two newcomers for their team.  Xavier Silas, a transfer from Colorado, who made his Northern Illinois day-view after sitting out one year because of NCAA transfer rules.  Another newcomer will be Keith Smith, who redshirted his first season.

The Huskies were predicted to finish 2nd in the MAC West.

During the season 
Northern Illinois had a rough start to its 2009-10 campaign.  In the opening loss to Northwestern, Xavier Silas went down with a fracture on his shooting hand, an injury that would sideline him for one month.  The loss was a tough blow for NIU, because Silas was expected to be a key contributor to the team after averaging double figures in scoring during his two years at Colorado.

Without Silas, the Huskies struggled through the non-conference schedule.  They were 1-5 when Silas made his come back against Minnesota.  In his first two games back, Silas shot the ball poorly, showing clear signs of being rusty after sitting out for a whole month.  The Huskies lost both games and dropped to 1-7.

Tough loss to #18 Temple
With Silas back in form after his injury, Northern beat Maryland Eastern Shore behind his 19 points.  After winning only their second game of the season, NIU prepared to face their first ranked opponent at home in a long time.  The game was expected to be a blowout, but the Huskies hung tough for most of the game, but in the end Temple was just too much, winning 70-60.

6-game winning streak
After losing to ranked Temple, Northern would go on to win their next 6 games, including their first 4 conference games.  The 4-0 start in conference play marked the best start in school history.

During the 6-game winning streak, Silas averaged 22 points per contest.

6-game losing streak

Northern Illinois traveled to Central Michigan to play a veteran Chippewa squad.  After battling for most of the game, the Huskies fell short, losing 81-75 and snapping their winning streak.

Crossover play began against the East Division, widely considered the best of the MAC divisions.  The Huskies struggled mightily against the East, losing their next 5 games, giving up 90 points or more in three of those games.

Recruiting

Roster 
Roster current as of September 9, when their summer prospectus was published.

Coaching staff

Schedule 

|-
!colspan=9 style="" | Exhibition

|-
!colspan=9 style="" | Regular season

|-
!colspan=9 style="" | 

|- style="background:#f9f9f9;"
| colspan=10 | *Non-Conference Game.  #Rankings from AP Poll.  All times are in Eastern Time Zone.
|}

Statistics

References

Northern Illinois Huskies men's basketball seasons
Northern Illinois Huskies
Northern
Northern